Adriel Tadeu Ferreira da Silva (born 22 May 1997), commonly known as Adriel, is a Brazilian footballer who plays as a defender for Austrian club Austria Lustenau.

Club career
On 11 August 2021 he signed a one-year contract with Austria Lustenau in Austria.

Career statistics

Club

Notes

Honours
Austria Lustenau
 Austrian Football Second League: 2021–22

References

External links

1997 births
Living people
Brazilian footballers
Association football defenders
Grêmio Osasco Audax Esporte Clube players
Osasco Futebol Clube players
Audax Rio de Janeiro Esporte Clube players
Gainare Tottori players
Paysandu Sport Club players
SC Austria Lustenau players
J3 League players
2. Liga (Austria) players
Brazilian expatriate footballers
Expatriate footballers in Japan
Brazilian expatriate sportspeople in Japan
Expatriate footballers in Austria
Brazilian expatriate sportspeople in Austria
Footballers from São Paulo